Lee Yeong-hwan was a South Korean weightlifter. He competed in the men's light-heavyweight event at the 1948 Summer Olympics.

References

External links
  

Year of birth missing
Possibly living people
South Korean male weightlifters
Olympic weightlifters of South Korea
Weightlifters at the 1948 Summer Olympics
Place of birth missing
20th-century South Korean people